The Last Attraction is a 1929 Soviet film directed by Ivan Pravov and Olga Preobrazhenskaya.

Plot 
The film tells of the entry into the Red Army of young tight-rope walkers, and their fight against the soldiers of the Denikin army.

Starring 
 Ivan Bykov as Kurapov
 Yelena Maksimova as Polly
 Raisa Puzhnaya as Masha
 Naum Rogozhin as Klim Visloguby
 A. Sashin as Serge
 Leonid Yurenev as Vanichka

References

External links 

1929 films
1920s Russian-language films
Soviet black-and-white films